The Michigan Legislature is the legislature of the U.S. state of Michigan. It is organized as a bicameral body composed of an upper chamber, the Senate, and a lower chamber, the House of Representatives. Article IV of the Michigan Constitution, adopted in 1963, defines the role of the Legislature and how it is to be constituted. The chief purposes of the Legislature are to enact new laws and amend or repeal existing laws. The Legislature meets in the Capitol building in Lansing.

The 102nd Michigan Legislature was sworn in on January 11, 2023.

Titles
Members of the Senate are referred to as Senators and members of the House of Representatives are referred to as Representatives. Because this shadows the terminology used to describe members of Congress, constituents and the news media, using The Associated Press Stylebook, often refer to legislators as state senators or state representatives to avoid confusion with their federal counterparts.

Michigan Senate

The Senate is the upper house of the Legislature. Its members are elected on a partisan basis for four-year terms, concurrent with the election of the Governor of Michigan. The Senate consists of 38 members elected from single-member election districts ranging from 212,400 to 263,500 residents according to the most recent creation of districts (2002). Legislative districts are drawn on the basis of population figures through the federal decennial census. Senators' terms begin at noon on January 1 following their election. The Senate Chamber is located in the south wing of the State Capitol building. As of 2023, Democrats hold the majority in the Senate with 20 seats; Republicans hold the minority with 18 seats. Under the Michigan Constitution, the Lieutenant Governor of Michigan serves as President of the Senate, but may only cast a vote in the instance of a tie. The Senate selects its other officers and adopts its own rules of procedure at the start of a new Legislative Session.

Michigan House of Representatives

The House of Representatives is the lower house of the Legislature. Its members are elected on a partisan basis for two-year terms, at the same time at which Representatives in U.S. Congress are chosen. The House of Representatives consists of 110 members who are elected from single-member election districts ranging from 77,000 to 91,000 according to the most recent creation of districts (2012). Legislative districts are drawn on the basis of population figures through the federal decennial census. Representatives' terms begin at noon on January 1 following their election. The House of Representatives Chamber in the State Capitol is located in the north wing of the State Capitol building. As of 2023, Democrats hold a majority of seats in the House of Representatives with 56, and Republicans hold 54 seats. The House of Representatives selects its own Speaker of the House and other officers and adopts its rules of procedure at the start of a new legislative session.

Term limits
On November 3, 1992, almost 59 percent of Michigan voters backed Proposal B, the Michigan Term Limits Amendment, which amended the State Constitution, to enact term limits on federal and state officials. In 1995, the U.S. Supreme Court ruled that states could not enact congressional term limits, but ruled that the state-level term limits remain. Under the amendment, a person could be elected to the office of governor, attorney general, and secretary of state two times each. It also limited the number of times a person could be elected to the House of Representatives to three times, and to the Senate two times. A provision governing partial terms was also included. These provisions became Article IV, section 54 and Article V, section 30 of the Michigan Constitution. On November 8, 2022, voters approved Proposal 1, further limiting state representatives and senators to 12 years combined in either chamber of the legislature, but senators re-elected in 2022 would remain eligible for their new terms even if it pushed them over the 12-year limit.

Qualifications
Senators and Representatives must be a citizen of the United States, at least 21 years of age, and an elector of the district they represents. Under state law, moving out of the district shall be deemed a vacation of the office. No person who has been convicted of subversion or who has within the preceding 20 years been convicted of a felony involving a breach of public trust shall be eligible for either house of the legislature.

Legislative session
For reckoning periods of time during which the Legislature operates, each two-year period coinciding with the election of new members of the House of Representatives is numbered consecutively as a legislature, dating to the first legislature following adoption of Michigan's first constitution. The current two-year term of the legislature (January 11, 2023 – January 8, 2025) is the 102nd Legislature.

Each year during which the Legislature meets constitutes a new legislative session. According to Article IV Section 13 of the Michigan Constitution, a new session of the Legislature begins when the members of each house convene, on the second Wednesday of January every year at noon. A regular session of the Legislature typically lasts throughout the entire year with several periods of recess and adjourns sine die in late December.

The Michigan Legislature is one of ten full-time state legislative bodies in the United States. Members receive a base salary of $71,685 per year, which makes them the fourth-highest paid legislators in the country, after California, Pennsylvania and New York. While legislators in many states receive per diems that make up for lower salaries, Michigan legislators receive $10,800 per year for session and interim expenses. Salaries and expense allowances are determined by the State Officers Compensation Commission.

Any legislation pending in either chamber at the end of a session that is not the end of a legislative term of office continues and carries over to the next Legislative Session.

Powers and process
The Michigan Legislature is authorized by the Michigan Constitution to create and amend the laws of the U.S. state of Michigan, subject to the Governor's power to veto legislation. To do so, legislators propose legislation in the forms of bills drafted by a nonpartisan, professional staff. Successful legislation must undergo committee review, three readings on the floor of each house, with appropriate voting majorities, as required, and either be signed into law by the Governor or enacted through a veto override approved by two-thirds of the membership of each legislative house.

Leadership
The House of Representatives is headed by the Speaker, while the Senate is headed by the Lieutenant Governor of Michigan, who serves as President of the Senate but may only cast a vote in the instance of a tie.

The Speaker of the House and the Senate Majority Leader control the assignment of committees and leadership positions, along with control of the agenda in their chambers. The two leaders, along with the Governor of Michigan, control most of the agenda of state business in Michigan.

President of the Michigan Senate (Lieutenant Governor): Garlin Gilchrist (D)
President Pro Tempore of the Michigan Senate: Jeremy Moss (D)
Majority Leader of the Michigan Senate: Winnie Brinks (D)
Minority Leader of the Michigan Senate: Aric Nesbitt (R)
Speaker of the House: Joe Tate (D)
Speaker Pro Tempore of the Michigan House: Laurie Pohutsky (D)
Majority Leader of the Michigan House: Abraham Aiyash (D)
Minority Leader of the Michigan House: Matt Hall (R)

See also

Government of Michigan

References

External links
Michigan Legislature

 
Bicameral legislatures
Government of Michigan